Anna's hummingbird (Calypte anna) is a medium-sized bird species of the family Trochilidae. It was named after Anna Masséna, Duchess of Rivoli.

It is native to western coastal regions of North America. In the early 20th century, Anna's hummingbirds bred only in northern Baja California and southern California. The transplanting of exotic ornamental plants in residential areas throughout the Pacific coast and inland deserts provided expanded nectar and nesting sites, allowing the species to expand its breeding range. Year-round residence of Anna's hummingbirds in the Pacific Northwest is an example of ecological release dependent on acclimation to colder winter temperatures, introduced plants, and human provision of nectar feeders during winter.

These birds feed on nectar from flowers using a long extendable tongue. They also consume small insects and other arthropods caught in flight or gleaned from vegetation.

Taxonomy
Anna's hummingbird was formally described and illustrated in 1829 by the French naturalist René Lesson in his Histoire naturelle des Oiseaux-Mouches from a specimen that had been collected in California. Lesson placed it in the genus Ornismya and coined the binomial name Ornismya anna. Anna's hummingbird is now placed in the genus Calypte that was introduced in 1856 by the English ornithologist John Gould. Gould did not explain the derivation of the genus name but it is probably from the Ancient Greek kaluptrē meaning "woman’s veil" or "head-dress" (from kaluptō meaning "to cover"). The specific epithet anna was chosen to honour Anne d'Essling who married the ornithologist François Victor Massena, 3rd Duke of Rivoli. The species is monotypic: no subspecies are recognised.

Description
They have an iridescent bronze-green back, a pale grey chest and belly, and green flanks. Their bills are long, straight, and slender. The adult male has an iridescent crimson-red, derived from magenta, to a reddish-pink crown and gorget, which can look dull brown or gray without direct sunlight, and a dark, slightly forked tail. Females also have iridescent red gorgets, although they are usually smaller and less brilliant than the male.

The male Anna's hummingbird is the only North American hummingbird species with a red crown. Females and juvenile males have a dull green crown, a grey throat with or without some red iridescence, a grey chest and belly, and a dark, rounded tail with white tips on the outer feathers.

The male has a striking reddish-pink crown and gorget, which are strongly iridescent and dependent on the angle of illumination and observation by female or male competitor birds. The iridescence results from large stacks of melanosomes in the feather barbules, occurring as layers separated by keratin. The barbules reflect incident light in the manner of partially-opened Venetian blinds, enabling the iridescence  which varies the head and gorget coloration with the changing angle of light  as a coloration advantage for courtship attraction and territory defense.

Male birds with elevated levels of protein in their diet have more colorful crowns and higher iridescence in their head feathers compared with male birds with low protein intake.

The male's call is scratchy and metallic, and it perches above head-level in trees and shrubs. They are frequently seen in backyards and parks, and commonly found at feeders and flowering plants. Anna's hummingbirds eat flying insects.

Distribution and habitat
Anna's hummingbirds are found along the western coast of North America, from southern Canada to northern Baja California, and inland to southern and central Arizona, extreme southern Nevada and southeastern Utah, and western Texas. They tend to be permanent residents within their range. However, birds have been spotted far outside their range in such places as southern Alaska, Saskatchewan, New York, Florida, Louisiana, and Newfoundland.

Northern range expansion

Anna's hummingbirds have the northernmost year-round range of any hummingbird. Birds have been recorded in Alaska as early as 1971, and resident in the Pacific Northwest since the 1960s, particularly increasing as a resident population during the early 21st century. Scientists estimate that some birds overwinter and presumably breed at northern latitudes where food and shelter are available throughout winter, tolerating moderately cold winter temperatures.

During cold temperatures, Anna's hummingbirds gradually gain weight during the day as they convert sugar to fat. In addition, hummingbirds with inadequate stores of body fat or insufficient plumage are able to survive periods of subfreezing weather by lowering their metabolic rate and entering a state of torpor.

While their range was originally limited to the chaparral of California and Baja California, it expanded northward to Oregon, Washington, and British Columbia, and east to Arizona in the 1960s and 70s. This rapid expansion is attributed to the widespread planting of non-native species, such as eucalyptus, as well as the use of urban bird feeders, in combination with the species' natural tendency for extensive postbreeding dispersal. In the Pacific Northwest, the fastest growing populations occur in regions with breeding-season cold temperatures similar to those of its native range. Northward expansion of the Anna's hummingbird represents an ecological release associated with introduced plants, year-round nectar availability from feeders supplied by humans, milder winter temperatures possibly associated with climate change, and acclimation of the species to a winter climate cooler than its native region. Although quantitative data are absent, it is likely that a sizable percentage of Anna's hummingbirds in the Pacific Northwest still do migrate south for winter, as of 2017.

Behavior
While collecting nectar, the Anna's hummingbird assists in plant pollination. There is evidence that Anna's hummingbirds in flight generate an electrostatic charge that would adhere pollen to their beaks and feathers, facilitating transfer of pollen grains to hundreds of flowers per day while foraging for nectar. This species sometimes consumes tree sap.

Anna's hummingbirds can shake their bodies 55 times per second to shed rain while in flight, or in dry weather, to remove pollen or dirt from feathers. Each twist lasts four-hundredths of a second and applies 34 times the force of gravity on the bird's head.

Locomotion
During hovering flight, Anna's hummingbirds maintain high wingbeat frequencies accomplished by their large pectoral muscles via recruitment of motor units. The pectoral muscles that power hummingbird flight are composed exclusively of fast glycolytic fibers that respond rapidly and are fatigue-resistant.

Breeding

Open-wooded or shrubby areas and mountain meadows along the Pacific coast from British Columbia to Arizona make up C. anna's breeding habitat. The female raises the young without the assistance of the male. The female bird builds a nest in a shrub or tree, in vines, or attached to wires or other artificial substrates. The round,  diameter nest is constructed of plant fibers, downy feathers and animal hair; the exterior is camouflaged with chips of lichen, plant debris, and occasionally urban detritus such as paint chips and cigarette paper. The nest materials are bound together with spider silk. They are known to nest as early as mid-December and as late as June, depending on geographic location and climatic conditions.

Unlike most northern temperate hummingbirds, the male Anna's hummingbird sings during courtship. The song is thin and squeaky, interspersed with buzzes and chirps, and is drawn to over 10 seconds in duration. During the breeding season, males can be observed performing an aerial display dive over their territories. When a female flies onto a male's territory, the male rises up about  before diving over the female. At the bottom of the dive, the male travels , and produces an audible sound produced by the tail feathers, described by some as an "explosive squeak".

Anna's hummingbirds hybridize fairly frequently with other species, especially the congeneric Costa's hummingbird. These natural hybrids have been mistaken for new species. A bird, allegedly collected in Bolaños, Mexico, was described and named Selasphorus floresii (Gould, 1861), or Floresi's hummingbird. Several more specimens were collected in California over a long period, and the species was considered extremely rare.

The specimens were the hybrid offspring of an Anna's hummingbird and an Allen's hummingbird. A single bird collected in Santa Barbara, California, was described and named Trochilus violajugulum (Jeffries, 1888), or violet-throated hummingbird. It was later determined to be a hybrid between an Anna's hummingbird and a black-chinned hummingbird.

Relationship to humans
In the 2017 Vancouver Official City Bird Election, Anna's hummingbird was named the official bird of the city of Vancouver, British Columbia, Canada, where it resides year round through winter.

Status
The population of Anna's hummingbirds is estimated to be 1.5 million, and appears to be stable. They are not an endangered species. Among the eight most common hummingbirds in Canada and the United States, only the population of Anna's hummingbirds has been increasing since 1970.

Gallery

References

External links

 
 

Anna's hummingbird
Native birds of Western Canada
Native birds of the Western United States
Native birds of the West Coast of the United States
Fauna of the Baja California Peninsula
Fauna of the Lower Colorado River Valley
Fauna of the Colorado Desert
Fauna of the Sonoran Desert
Fauna of the California chaparral and woodlands
Fauna of the San Francisco Bay Area
Anna's hummingbird
Anna's hummingbird